Wakeland may refer to:

Wakeland, Indiana, United States, an unincorporated community
Wakeland High School, a public high school located in Frisco, Texas, United States
Bryan Wakeland, American drummer in the bands Tripping Daisy and The Polyphonic Spree
Chris Wakeland, American baseball player